JMW may refer to:
 Jan Muhammad Wala railway station, in Pakistan
 Mouwase language, variety of a Papuan language of Papua New Guinea